Tancook Island may refer to two different islands located in Mahone Bay in Lunenburg County, Nova Scotia, Canada:

 Big Tancook Island
 Little Tancook Island